Notable playwrights from the United States include:

18th century

19th century

20th century

21st century

See also
Theater of the United States
 List of American plays
 List of playwrights
 List of playwrights by nationality and year of birth
 List of Jewish American playwrights

References

Further reading
Meserve, Walter J. An Outline History of American Drama, 2nd ed., New York: Feedback Theatrebooks/Prospero Press, 1994.

United States
 
Playwrights